Vladislav Zhuk (born 11 June 1994) is a Belarusian professional footballer who plays for Slavia Mozyr.

Honours
BATE Borisov
Belarusian Super Cup winner: 2017

References

External links 
 
 

1994 births
Living people
Belarusian footballers
Association football midfielders
FC Energetik-BGU Minsk players
FC Slavia Mozyr players
FC BATE Borisov players
FC Smolevichi players
FC Slutsk players